The 1988 Manitoba general election was held on April 26, 1988 to elect Members of the Legislative Assembly of the Province of Manitoba, Canada. It resulted in a minority government.  The Progressive Conservative Party won 25 seats, against 20 for the Liberal Party and 12 for the New Democratic Party.

Background
The election was called unexpectedly in early 1988, after disgruntled NDP backbencher Jim Walding voted against his government's budget on March 9, 1988.  With former cabinet minister Laurent Desjardins having essentially abandoned his seat earlier in the year, the Legislative Assembly was almost evenly divided. Walding's defection thus resulted in Howard Pawley's NDP government being defeated, 28 votes to 27.  As the budget vote was a confidence measure, the Pawley ministry was forced to resign and call new elections two years ahead of schedule.

Popular support for the NDP was at an historically low level when the election was called, due to soaring Autopac rates and a taxpayer-funded bailout of the Manitoba Telephone System.  The Pawley government's support for the Meech Lake Accord was also unpopular in some circles.  One internal poll had the party at only 6% support, and there were concerns that they could be reduced to only two or three seats in the 57-seat legislature.  Pawley resigned as party leader on the day after the budget defeat, and Urban Affairs Minister Gary Doer narrowly defeated Agriculture Minister Leonard Harapiak to replace him at a party convention held during the campaign.

Pawley himself announced he would enter federal politics did not seek re-election in his own seat. In an unusual arrangement, the outgoing premier remained in office until after the election. Even after Doer's selection, the consensus was that the NDP would not be reelected.  However, they managed to stabilize at around 20% in the polls.  Many traditional NDP voters, especially in the city of Winnipeg, abandoned the party to support the Liberals in this cycle.

Issues
The Progressive Conservatives, led by Gary Filmon, ran on a platform of saving revenue by selling public corporations, including ManOil and Manfor.  Filmon also promised to scrap the province's Public Investment Corporation entirely.  The Liberals also promised more prudent fiscal management, but did not propose to sell these crown corporations.  Liberal leader Sharon Carstairs was also known as a prominent opponent of the Meech Lake Accord.

The NDP, which retained a support base in the north of the province, promised to create northern training centres in Thompson and The Pas.

The national abortion debate also surfaced in this campaign, although none of the major parties put forward a clear position on the issue.  Although Filmon was personally anti-abortion, the Progressive Conservatives were unwilling to propose specific action on the subject, and withdrew from an early promise to close Henry Morgentaler's private clinic.  The Liberals favoured counselling, including a focus on adoption.  The NDP emphasized prevention and support services for poorer women who choose to continue their pregnancies.

The small Progressive Party promised balanced budgets, opposed affirmative action, and was against government interference in negotiations between trade unions and management.

Campaign
The Progressive Conservatives entered the election with a significant lead in the polls, but saw their support undercut by the Liberals in the campaign's final weeks.  Before the party leaders' debate, a Winnipeg Free Press poll indicated that 40% of voters considered Liberal leader Sharon Carstairs as the best choice for Premier, with 24% favouring Progressive Conservative Gary Filmon and 19% favouring NDP leader Gary Doer.  17% were undecided.

Carstairs performed well in the leaders' debate, and did much to improve her party's popularity as the campaign reached its end.

Results
The Liberal Party performed well in Winnipeg, winning 19 out of 29 seats in that city and picking up ridings from both the NDP and Tories, and nearly managed to oust Filmon in his riding of Tuxedo, in south-central Winnipeg. The party won only one seat outside Winnipeg, however—Pawley's former seat of Selkirk, centred on the community of the same name just north of Winnipeg. It was and still is the party's best showing in an election since the then Liberal-Progressives won their last majority in 1953.

In terms of the popular vote, the Progressive Conservatives actually lost support from the last election. However, they dominated the rural southern portion of the province, a traditional Tory stronghold. They made some inroads into traditional NDP territory immediately north of Winnipeg. The party also won six seats in Winnipeg, and took the northern seat of Swan River from the NDP.

The New Democrats managed to retain four seats in Winnipeg, five in the north, the mid-northern ridings of Dauphin and Interlake, and Brandon East in the south of the province. It is still the worst defeat that an NDP government has suffered in Manitoba.

Exit polls later revealed that new voters (i.e., immigrants and first-time voters) had polled strongly for the Liberals in Winnipeg.

Although Pawley had retired from politics and his party was reduced to third place, by constitutional convention he retained the right to remain in office until the NDP was defeated in the legislature, as well as the right to advise whether Lieutenant Governor George Johnson should appoint Filmon or Carstairs as the new premier upon leaving office. Doer also could have attempted to negotiate a coalition with the Liberals. Instead, he informally reached a deal with Filmon in which the NDP would tolerate a Tory minority government. As a result, Pawley finally resigned as Premier of Manitoba on May 9 and advised Johnson to appoint Filmon his successor. Filmon was duly sworn in later that day after advising Johnson that he could form a government.

1 "Before" refers to standings in the Legislature at dissolution, and not to the results of the previous election. These numbers therefore reflect changes in party standings as a result of by-elections and members crossing the floor.

Riding results

|-
| style="background:whitesmoke;"|Arthur
|
|Goldwyn Jones575
||
|Jim Downey4,359
|
|Douglas Mosset2,171
|
|Ross Meggison (CoR)863
||
|Jim Downey
|-
| style="background:whitesmoke;"|Assiniboia
|
|Robert Johannson1,031
|
|Ric Nordman3,731
||
|Ed Mandrake3,918
|
|Linda Cress (WIP)166
||
|Ric Nordman
|-
| style="background:whitesmoke;"|Brandon East
||
|Leonard Evans3,512
|
|Jim Armstrong2,859
|
|Lois Fjeldsted2,260
|
|Garth Shurvell (Ind)208
||
|Leonard Evans
|-
| style="background:whitesmoke;"|Brandon West
|
|Ishbel Solvason2,313
||
|James McCrae5,039
|
|John Worley3,618
|
|
||
|James McCrae
|-
| style="background:whitesmoke;"|Burrows
|
|Doug Martindale3,005
|
|Allan Yap1,040
||
|William Chornopyski3,114
|
|Michael Kibzey (Ind)129Lorne Robson (Comm)79
||
|Conrad Santos
|-
| style="background:whitesmoke;"|Charleswood
|
|Bruno Zimmer1,180
||
|Jim Ernst6,670
|
|Shari Nelson5,850
|
|David Hollins (Ind)158
||
|Jim Ernst
|-
| style="background:whitesmoke;"|Churchill
||
|Jay Cowan2,396
|
|Wayne Wittmeier1,019
|
|George Kernaghan714
|
|
||
|Jay Cowan
|-
| style="background:whitesmoke;"|Concordia
||
|Gary Doer3,702
|
|Vic Rubiletz2,634
|
|Barbara Blomeley2,948
|
|Bill Seman (Ind)358Fred Cameron (WIP)114Charles Henry (P)61
||
|Gary Doer
|-
| style="background:whitesmoke;"|Dauphin
||
|John Plohman3,983
|
|Russell Secord3,435
|
|Peter Rampton2,475
|
|
||
|John Plohman
|-
| style="background:whitesmoke;"|Ellice
|
|Harvey Smith2,457
|
|Alex Arenson1,538
||
|Avis Gray3,081
|
|Susan Caine (WIP)109

||
|Harvey Smith
|-
| style="background:whitesmoke;"|Elmwood
||
|Jim Maloway3,012
|
|Frank Syms1,920
|
|Ed Price2,839
|
|Russ Letkeman (Lbt)113
||
|Jim Maloway
|-
| style="background:whitesmoke;"|Emerson
|
|Kurt Penner1,407
||
|Albert Driedger5,027
|
|Martin Stadler2,615
|
|Jake Wall (CoR)366
||
|Albert Driedger
|-
| style="background:whitesmoke;"|Flin Flon
||
|Jerry Storie2,948
|
|Gordon Mitchell1,563
|
|Brian King867
|
|
||
|Jerry Storie
|-
| style="background:whitesmoke;"|Fort Garry
|
|Brian Pannell1,553
|
|Charlie Birt5,173
||
|Laurie Evans6,055
|
|Ivan Merritt (WIP)173Millie Lamb (Comm)45
||
|Charlie Birt
|-
| style="background:whitesmoke;"|
Fort Rouge
|
|Roland Penner2,912
|
|Robert Haier2,303
||
|Jim Carr5,127
|
|Gordon Pratt (P)75Dennis Owens (Lbt)66
||
|Roland Penner
|-
| style="background:whitesmoke;"|Gimli
|
|John Bucklaschuk3,352
||
|Ed Helwer4,716
|
|Morley Murray2,347
|
|Eugene Klochko (WIP)261
||
|John Bucklaschuk
|-
| style="background:whitesmoke;"|Gladstone
|
|Fred Tait509
||
|Charlotte Oleson3,760
|
|Cordell Barker2,132
|
|Brian Hildebrandt (CoR)759
||
|Charlotte Oleson
|-
| style="background:whitesmoke;"|Inkster
|
|Don Scott4,098
|
|Resty Taruc2,151
||
|Kevin Lamoureux4,466
|
|Nancy Watkins (Comm)64
||
|Don Scott
|-
| style="background:whitesmoke;"|Interlake
||
|Bill Uruski3,057
|
|Ed Dandeneau2,810
|
|Clyde Sigurdson1,777
|
|
||
|Bill Uruski
|-
| style="background:whitesmoke;"|Kildonan
|
|Marty Dolin4,542
|
|John Baluta5,068
||
|Gulzar Cheema5,653
|
|Sidney Green (P)445Tracy Fuhr (WIP)133
||
|Marty Dolin
|-
| style="background:whitesmoke;"|Kirkfield Park
|
|Hamish Gavin868
||
|Gerrie Hammond5,269
|
|Irene Friesen5,014
|
|
||
|Gerrie Hammond
|-
| style="background:whitesmoke;"|Lac du Bonnet
|
|Clarence Baker2,911
||
|Darren Praznik3,773
|
|Peter Raymond2,411
|
|
||
|Clarence Baker
|-
| style="background:whitesmoke;"|Lakeside
|
|Eduard Hiebert972
||
|Harry Enns4,475
|
|Delmer Nott2,828
|
|Cam Baldwin (CoR)864
||
|Harry Enns
|-
| style="background:whitesmoke;"|La Verendrye
|
|Walter McDowell708
||
|Helmut Pankratz4,377
|
|Cornelius E. Goertzen2,948
|
|
||
|Helmut Pankratz
|-
| style="background:whitesmoke;"|Logan
||
|Maureen Hemphill2,646
|
|Linda Thomson1,085
|
|John Dobbin1,660
|
|Barry Marchand (Ind)81Frank Goldspink (Comm)46
||
|Maureen Hemphill
|-
| style="background:whitesmoke;"|Minnedosa
|
|Susan Proven1,476
||
|Harold Gilleshammer3,669
|
|Terry Drebit2,496
|
|Dennis Heeney (CoR)820
||
|Dave Blake
|-
| style="background:whitesmoke;"|Morris
|
|Clifford Hodgins449
||
|Clayton Manness4,578
|
|Barbara Plas1,832
|
|Raymond Switzer (CoR)597Jeffrey Plas (Ind)57
||
|Clayton Manness
|-
| style="background:whitesmoke;"|Niakwa
|
|Stan Williams2,026
|
|Abe Kovnats7,222
||
|Herold Driedger8,576
|
|Lyle Cruickshank (WIP)237
||
|Abe Kovnats
|-
| style="background:whitesmoke;"|Osborne
|
|Muriel Smith2,753
|
|Rosemary Vodrey2,421
||
|Reg Alcock4,334
|
|Clancy Smith (Lbt)145
||
|Muriel Smith
|-
| style="background:whitesmoke;"|Pembina
|
|Hans Wittich382
||
|Don Orchard6,043
|
|Marilyn Skubovius2,171
|
|Abe Giesbrecht (CoR)499
||
|Don Orchard
|-
| style="background:whitesmoke;"|Portage la Prairie
|
|Bill Zettler722
||
|Ed Connery4,020
|
|Darlene Hamm2,812
|
|Irene Armishaw (CoR)603
||
|Ed Connery
|-
| style="background:whitesmoke;"|Radisson
|
|Gerard Lecuyer3,113
|
|John Samborski3,049
||
|Allan Patterson4,918
|
|
||
|Gerard Lecuyer
|-
| style="background:whitesmoke;"|Rhineland
|
|Reg Loeppky341
||
|Jack Penner5,166
|
|Walter Hebert1,059
|
|
||
|Arnold Brown
|-
| style="background:whitesmoke;"|Riel
|
|Bob Ages1,834
||
|Gerry Ducharme4,289
|
|Chris Sigurdson3,965
|
|John Hiebert (CoR)121Neil Knight (WIP)75
||
|Gerry Ducharme
|-
| style="background:whitesmoke;"|River East
|
|Michael Dyck3,019
||
|Bonnie Mitchelson7,563
|
|Morley Golden3,805
|
|Niel Friesen (WIP)233
||
|Bonnie Mitchelson
|-
| style="background:whitesmoke;"|River Heights
|
|Harry Daniels1,036
|
|Bob Vandewater3,373
||
|Sharon Carstairs6,620
|
|Jim Weidman (Lbt)62
||
|Sharon Carstairs
|-
| style="background:whitesmoke;"|Roblin-Russell
|
|Dennis Trinder1,973
||
|Len Derkach4,030
|
|Neil Stewart2,513
|
|
||
|Len Derkach
|-
| style="background:whitesmoke;"|Rossmere
|
|Vic Schroeder3,424
||
|Harold Neufeld3,950
|
|Cecilia Connelly2,851
|
|Chris Dondo (WIP)146
||
|Vic Schroeder
|-
| style="background:whitesmoke;"|Rupertsland
||
|Elijah Harper2,206
|
|Joe Guy Wood1,419
|
|Maurice Berens638
|
|
||
|Elijah Harper
|-
| style="background:whitesmoke;"|St. Boniface
|
|Lorette Beaudry-Ferland2,061
|
|Guy Savoie1,586
||
|Neil Gaudry5,743
|
|
||
|Laurent Desjardins
|-
| style="background:whitesmoke;"|St. James
|
|Allan MacDonald2,171
|
|Jae Eadie3,360
||
|Paul Edwards3,939
|
|Fred Debrecen (CoR)137Charles Lamont (P)74Dennis Rice (Lbt)69Merle Hartlin (WIP)62
||
|Al Mackling
|-
| style="background:whitesmoke;"|St. Johns
||
|Judy Wasylycia-Leis3,092
|
|Lynn Filbert1,222
|
|Ruth Oberman2,480
|
|Cyril Fogel (P)171Roy Price (Ind)68Gerald Zucawich (Ind)35
||
|Judy Wasylycia-Leis
|-
| style="background:whitesmoke;"|St. Norbert
|
|Bennetta Benson1,460
|
|Gerry Mercier5,695
||
|John Angus6,073
|
|
||
|Gerry Mercier
|-
| style="background:whitesmoke;"|St. Vital
|
|Gerri Unwin2,282
|
|Paul Herriot3,614
||
|Bob Rose4,431
|
|Katharina Cameron (WIP)123Trevor Wiebe (Lbt)46
||
|Jim Walding
|-
| style="background:whitesmoke;"|Ste. Rose
|
|Gerald Follows1,464
||
|Glen Cummings3,723
|
|Brent Johnson2,631
|
|David Mutch249
||
|Glen Cummings
|-
| style="background:whitesmoke;"|Selkirk
|
|Terry Sargeant3,637
|
|Eugene Kinaschuk3,138
||
|Gwen Charles3,821
|
|Ruth VanKoeveringe (WIP)214
||
|Howard Pawley
|-
| style="background:whitesmoke;"|Seven Oaks
|
|Eugene Kostyra3,553
|
|George Finkle1,636
||
|Mark Minenko3,885
|
|
||
|Eugene Kostyra
|-
| style="background:whitesmoke;"|Springfield
|
|Andy Anstett3,749
||
|Gilles Roch5,815
|
|Lance Laufer3,806
|
|
||
|Gilles Roch
|-
| style="background:whitesmoke;"|Sturgeon Creek
|
|Len Sawatsky993
|
|Frank Johnston4,174
||
|Iva Yeo4,833
|
|Hugh Buskell (CoR)158Nigel Hanrahan (Comm)27
||
|Frank Johnston
|-
| style="background:whitesmoke;"|Swan River
|
|Len Harapiak3,446
||
|Parker Burrell4,115
|
|Don Dennis653
|
|
||
|Len Harapiak
|-
| style="background:whitesmoke;"|The Pas
||
|Harry Harapiak3,221
|
|Bruce Unfried1,584
|
|Scott Gray1,426
|
|
||
|Harry Harapiak
|-
| style="background:whitesmoke;"|Thompson
||
|Steve Ashton2,992
|
|Ken Collin1,989
|
|Janice Pronteau1,240
|
|
||
|Steve Ashton
|-
| style="background:whitesmoke;"|Transcona
|
|Wilson Parasiuk3,191
|
|Bill Omiucke2,270
||
|Richard Kozak3,900
|
|Ray Hargreaves (Ind)121
||
|Wilson Parasiuk
|-
| style="background:whitesmoke;"|Turtle Mountain
|
|John Miller446
||
|Denis Rocan3,208
|
|Ross McMillan2,610
|
|Rod Stephenson (Ind)767Harold Parsonage (CoR)476Bill Harrison (Ind)102William Comer (WIP)87
||
|Denis Rocan
|-
| style="background:whitesmoke;"|Tuxedo
|
|Catherine Hofman714
||
|Gary Filmon6,427
|
|Jasper McKee6,303
|
|R. EisBrenner (WIP)149
||
|Gary Filmon
|-
| style="background:whitesmoke;"|Virden
|
|Louise Leask967
||
|Glen Findlay4,459
|
|Bill Davison2,043
|
|Alex Gabrielle (CoR)588Terry Drul (WIP)160
||
|Glen Findlay
|-
| style="background:whitesmoke;"|Wolseley
|
|Myrna Phillips3,112
|
|Kirk Stanley1,579
||
|Harold Taylor3,618
|
|Derek Shettler (P)149
||
|Myrna Phillips
|-
|}

Post-election changes
Gilles Roch (PC) becomes (L) on September 8, 1988.

Opinion polls

See also
 List of Manitoba political parties

References

1988
1988 elections in Canada
1988 in Manitoba
April 1988 events in Canada